In mathematics, and especially topology and differential geometry, a pinched torus (or croissant surface) is a kind of two-dimensional surface. It gets its name from its resemblance to a torus that has been pinched at a single point. A pinched torus is an example of an orientable, compact 2-dimensional pseudomanifold.

Parametrisation 

A pinched torus is easily parametrisable. Let us write . An example of such a parametrisation − which was used to plot the picture − is given by  where:

Topology 

Topologically, the pinched torus is homotopy equivalent to the wedge of a sphere and a circle. It is homeomorphic to a sphere with two distinct points being identified.

Homology 

Let P denote the pinched torus. The homology groups of P over the integers can be calculated. They are given by:

Cohomology 

The cohomology groups of P over the integers can be calculated. They are given by:

References 

Surfaces